Tong Wei is a fictional character in Water Margin, one of the Four Great Classical Novels in Chinese literature. Nicknamed "Dragon Emerging from a Cave", he ranks 68th among the 108 Stars of Destiny and 32nd among the 72 Earthly Fiends.

Background 
Living at Jieyang Ridge (揭陽嶺; believed to be in present-day Jiujiang, Jiangxi) near the Xunyang River with his younger brother Tong Meng, Tong Wei is a very good swimmer and could fight in water. The brothers are sidekicks of salt smuggler Li Jun, assisting him in his illegal activity on the river.

Joining Liangshan 
When Song Jiang is on his way to exile in Jiangzhou (江州; present-day Jiujiang, Jiangxi), a reduced sentence for killing his mistress Yan Poxi, he passes by Jieyang Ridge with his two escorts and stops to eat at Li Li's inn. Li knocks them out with his drugged wine. Just as Li waits for his men to come help cut up the three, Li Jun and the Tong brothers come to the inn for some refreshment. Li Jun finds official document on the guards which confirms the exile is Song Jiang. Li Jun in fact has been waiting at the Xunyang River in hopes of meeting Song, whom he admires for his chivalry. Li Li immediately revives Song Jiang. They treat Song as an honoured guest until he leaves for Jiangzhou.

Song Jiang later offends the Mu brothers (Mu Hong and Mu Chun) in the nearby Jieyang Town. While being pursued by the Mus, he boards the boat of the pirate boatman Zhang Heng. Midway across the river, Zhang wants to kill and rob the three. Just then Li Jun and the Tong brothers pass by in their boat and save Song in the nick of time. Surprised to hear that the fellow is Song Jiang, Zhang offer his apologies.

In Jiangzhou Song Jiang is arrested and sentenced to death for writing a seditious poem on a wall in a restaurant. The outlaws from Liangshan Marsh rush to Jiangzhou and save him just when he is going to be beheaded. But they are stranded at a river bank. In the meantime, friends whom Song Jiang made at the Jieyang region, led by Li Jun and including Tong Wei, are sailing to Jiangzhou to rescue him. They come upon the group and ferry them to safety. Together they head to Liangshan, where Tong Wei becomes one of the chieftains.

Campaigns 
Tong Wei is appointed as one of the leaders of Liangshan's flotilla after the 108 Stars of Destiny came together in what is called the Grand Assembly. He participates in the campaigns against the Liao invaders and rebel forces in Song territory following amnesty from Emperor Huizong.for Liangshan.

The Tong brothers and Li Jun make significant contributions in the capture of the city of Suzhou in the campaign against Fang La,

The Tong brothers are among the Liangshan heroes who survive the campaigns. When the remaining Liangshan heroes are returning to the imperial capital Dongjing to receive rewards, Li Jun feigns illness and requests that the Tong brothers stay to take care of him. They are never seen again.

It is said that Li Jun, the Tong brothers and some friends whom they made at Lake Tai headed to the port city of Taicang where they sailed into the open sea. They arrived in Siam, where Li Jun became king and the Tong brothers his high officials.

References 
 
 
 
 
 
 
 

72 Earthly Fiends
Fictional characters from Jiangxi